Juan Alvariño is an Argentine former footballer who played for clubs from Argentina and Chile.

References
 

Living people
Argentine footballers
Argentine expatriate footballers
Club Atlético Atlanta footballers
Club Atlético Los Andes footballers
Juventud Antoniana footballers
Club Atlético Belgrano footballers
Deportivo Laferrere footballers
O'Higgins F.C. footballers
Club Deportivo Palestino footballers
Cobresal footballers
Chilean Primera División players
Expatriate footballers in Chile
Association football defenders
Year of birth missing (living people)
Footballers from Buenos Aires